Monaibacterium is a Gram-negative and aerobic genus of bacteria from the family of Rhodobacteraceae with one known species (Monaibacterium marinum). Monaibacterium marinum has been isolated from seawater from the Menai Strait.

References

Rhodobacteraceae
Bacteria genera
Monotypic bacteria genera